"Where Is the Love?" is a song by American hip hop group the Black Eyed Peas. It was released on May 12, 2003, as the lead single from their third album, Elephunk. The song was written by will.i.am, apl.de.ap, Taboo, Justin Timberlake, Printz Board, Michael Fratantuno, and George Pajon. The track features vocals from Timberlake, although he is not officially credited on the single release. It was the group's first song to feature singer Fergie as an official member.

"Where Is the Love?" saw success on radio airplay charts, peaked at number eight on the US Billboard Hot 100, and topped the charts in Australia, Ireland, and the United Kingdom, where it became the biggest-selling single of 2003. The band and Timberlake received two nominations, Record of the Year and Best Rap/Sung Collaboration, for "Where Is the Love?" at the 46th Annual Grammy Awards.

Background
Following the commercial failures of their previous albums and singles, there was doubt over whether the Black Eyed Peas would continue to record together. A&R executive Ron Fair approached them and suggested a crossover to a more mainstream pop sound. will.i.am in particular resisted the idea for fear that they would be seen as sellouts. However, after discussions and some writing sessions, the idea was pursued. After the release of 'Where is the Love' Taboo would claim on the topic of selling out that if he was going to sell out, he'd "rather be selling out arenas than selling out of my trunk on the corner of my block."

In an interview with The Telegraph in 2016, will.i.am alleges the inspiration for the original song came from the generalized anxiety following the September 11 attacks. will.i.am said: “On our last day (of recording sessions in San Francisco), as I was packing my equipment, I saw the first plane fly through the World Trade Center (...) I thought it was a film. The fear of driving back home, y’know going over San Francisco bridge. That 10 minute drive across the bridge felt like an hour.”  In the same interview will.i.am claims that the emotions from that time form the base emotions the song's lyrics are composed of.

Shortly after Christmas 2001, three months after 9/11, will.i.am created a loop and a guitar part that he liked. apl.de.ap and Taboo also heard the track and were able to write similar lyrics over it. Justin Timberlake was introduced to the group by Taboo, and got a chance to hear the track that will.i.am created. Impressed with the music, Timberlake helped write and sing the chorus. The production of Where is the Love was halted over the early half of 2002 as the band burned out over what will.i.am claimed was 9/11-induced anxiety during their tour in that year.
Timberlake was in the midst of promotion of his debut solo album, Justified, and his label Jive Records was concerned about possible overexposure. The Black Eyed Peas were worried about this, as getting some assistance from an established pop star like Timberlake had been the original point of this song. A compromise was reached eventually in which Jive gave clearance for the vocals of Timberlake to be released on the song, but he does not appear in the song's music video nor is he officially credited on the song as an artist. By 2008, the single had sold 954,000 digital copies.

Composition

Although initially intended as a vessel to post-9/11 anxiety, the song discusses many issues including terrorism, US government hypocrisy, racism, gang crime, pollution, war and intolerance, with the call for love in the chorus as the element tying these together. The lyric "Overseas, yeah, we try'na stop terrorism - but we still got terrorists here living - in the USA, the big CIA - the Bloods and the Crips and the KKK" suggests these organizations being terrorists too - however, in the later live performance of One Love Manchester the inclusion of the CIA was censored. The song was released during the Iraq war and alludes to it and its casus belli with the lyric "A war's going on but the reason's undercover" in the bridge.

The song has a tempo of 94 BPM. Will.i.am laid the track's iconic main rhythm over the chord progression, which he claimed is inspired by that of a human heartbeat. "I was like, 'this song needs a heartbeat.' (...) I just liked the pull and the call of response of the human heart – a beat, a rhythm that we hear everyday subconsciously, without paying attention to it."

Reception
As part of the album Elephunk, the song was met with critical and commercial success. Elephunk has a Metacritic score of 66/100. The Black Eyed Peas' album Elephunk sold 3.2 million copies as of 2011. David Jeffries of Drowned In Sound noted that it was the "long time coming" Black Eyed Peas hit, praising its dramatic delivery as "epic, positive, and concerned with where the world is going, “Where Is the Love” bounces between positive hip-hop and orchestral soul that royally recalls Marvin Gaye's social meditations." According to the Washington Post 'Where is the Love' propelled the Black Eyed Peas from the underground to the mainstream. Entertainment Weekly was more negative about the song, which deviates sharply from the Black Eyed Peas' rap roots, writing that "the biggest offense for a once smart-sounding rap collective is ”Where Is the Love,” the horrifyingly trite single with Justin Timberlake. It's enough to make longtime fans wonder, ”Where are the Peas?”" Chris Nettleson of Drowned in Sound refrains from commenting on Where is the Love directly but instead notes that other critics have unfairly regarded Elephunk as deviating from standard hiphop. Chris writes that Where is the Love is a "slightly saccharine hippy anti-gulf war anthem", but in the context of the entire album of Elephunk it is worth listening to.

The song was the biggest selling single of 2003 in the UK. It was also the 25th best-selling single of the 2000s (decade) in the UK.

Music video
The music video for "Where Is the Love?" was shot in East Los Angeles and features the Black Eyed Peas and various other people, including various young children, asking the world where the love really is. In the video, will.i.am and Taboo act as a soul music road duo who use music to tell people what is wrong with the world, Fergie appears as a peacemaker who places stickers with question marks on them all over the place to ask people where the love is in the world, and apl.de.ap is a criminal who is arrested for using criminal offences to tell people the truth. Justin Timberlake does not appear in the video, as he was promoting his album Justified at the time, though several different people are seen mouthing his part.

The video is similar to a 2002 British television advertisement for T-Mobile, in which a face of a young baby is presented in various forms around a large city, much like the question mark in this video. The Bon Jovi music video "Have a Nice Day" is also similar to both the advertisement and this video.

The video features gameplay footage of the extremely graphic and controversial video game Postal 2, in which a group of young children are playing the game. This suggests that violence in the media and entertainment industry affects the morals of children. Near the beginning of the video, posters of the video game Grand Theft Auto: Vice City are shown.

Track listings

US promo CD
 "Where Is the Love?" (radio edit) – 3:46
 "Where Is the Love?" (LP) – 4:32

UK CD single
 "Where Is the Love?"
 "Sumthin for That Ass"
 "Where Is the Love?" (instrumental)
 "Where Is the Love?" (video)

European CD single
 "Where Is the Love?"
 "Sumthin for That Ass"

Australian CD single
 "Where Is the Love?"
 "Sumthin for That Ass"
 "What's Going Down"
 "Where Is the Love?" (video)

Personnel
 Arranged by Ron Fair
 Writers – will.i.am, Justin Timberlake, Taboo, apl.de.ap, Printz Board, Michael Fratantuno, George Pajon, Jr.
Producers – will.i.am, Ron Fair

Charts

Weekly charts

Year-end charts

Decade-end charts

All-time charts

Certifications

Release history

2016 version

On August 31, 2016, a new version of the song titled "Where's the Love?" (stylized as "#WHERESTHELOVE"), credited to "The Black Eyed Peas featuring The World" was made available for digital download exclusively on iTunes and released to other digital retailers later that day. The song samples the original track but has additional music composition and features additional vocals from Justin Timberlake, Jamie Foxx, Ty Dolla Sign, Mary J. Blige, Diddy, Cassie, Andra Day, The Game, Tori Kelly, V. Bozeman, Jessie J, French Montana, DJ Khaled, Usher, Nicole Scherzinger, ASAP Rocky, Jaden Smith and a 40-member children's choir. All proceeds from the song were going to will.i.am's non-profit foundation, i.am.angel. – the charity funds educational programs and college scholarships. The Black Eyed Peas partnered with issues-driven media company ATTN and foundation education partner and leading geospatial company Esri for the single release campaign. It was the group's last song to feature singer Fergie.

Music video
An accompanying music video, directed by Michael Jurkovac, also premiered worldwide on Apple Music that same day and shows appearances by the featured vocalists and many celebrities including Connie Britton, Lance Bass, Rosario Dawson, Shailene Woodley, Taye Diggs, Kareem Abdul-Jabbar, Quincy Jones, Olivia Munn, Jhené Aiko, Krewella, Wiz Khalifa, Charlie Carver, Ian Harding, Max Carver, Daniel Sharman, Vanessa Hudgens, Russell Westbrook, Carla Gugino, DJ Khaled, Ben Barnes, Nikki Reed, Omarion, Jessica Szohr, Snoop Dogg, LL Cool J, Adrianne Palicki, Becky G, Adrienne Bailon, Kris Jenner, and Kendall Jenner.

Inspired by tragedies, like the attacks in Paris, and in Brussels and Orlando, and police shootings of Philando Castile and Alton Sterling, the Peas saw the relevance of the song and decided it was time to revive the track for a new generation. Family members affected by gun violence including (Alton Sterling's aunt Sandra, Philando Castile's mother Valerie) and police officials (Dallas Police Chief David O. Brown, Officer Miguel Salcedo) and more appear in the video.

Track listing
Digital download
"Where's the Love?" (featuring The World) – 5:25

Personnel
Credits adapted from the official press release.

 Produced, Instruments and Programming by Giorgio Tuinfort and will.i.am
 Mixed by will.i.am and Joe Peluso
 Mastered by Joe Bozzi
 Written by will.i.am, apl.de.ap, Taboo, Justin Timberlake, The Game, ASAP Rocky, DJ Khaled and Giorgio Tuinfort
 Piano by Giorgio Tuinfort
 First Violin by Ben Mathot, Inger van Vliet, Marleen Wester, Tseroeja van den Bos and Sofie van der Pol
 Second Violin by Judith van Driel, Loes Dooren, Diewertje Wanders and Azra Dizdar
 Alt Violin by Ian de Jong, Yanna Pelser, Bas Goossens
 Cello by David Faber and Jascha Bordon
 Bass by Hinse Mutter
 Horns by Jenneke de Jonge
 Trumpet by Printz Board
 Orchestra Midi Programming by Franck van der Heijden
 Orchestra Arrangement by Franck van der Heijden and Giorgio Tuinfort
 Orchestra recorded and mixed by Paul Power
 Vocals recorded by will.i.am and padraic kerin
 Main and additional vocals by the Black Eyed Peas, Justin Timberlake, Jamie Foxx, Ty Dolla $ign, Mary J. Blige, Diddy, Cassie, Andra Day, The Game, Tori Kelly, V. Bozeman, Jessie J, French Montana, DJ Khaled, Usher, Nicole Scherzinger, ASAP Rocky, Jaden Smith and a 40-member children's choir.

Charts

2016 Spanish/English version
The Black Eyed Peas also released a bilingual Spanish/English version of "Where's the Love?", titled "Dónde Está El Amor?" crediting the Black Eyed Peas featuring El Mundo. The version was premiered on November 7, 2016, during Premios de la Radio. The music video premiered days later, featuring a roster of Latin stars including Gerardo Ortiz, Milkman, Pepe Aguilar, Becky G, Fey, Paulina Rubio, Luis Coronel, and many others.

See also
List of Romanian Top 100 number ones of the 2000s
List of anti-war songs

References

2000s ballads
2010s ballads
2003 singles
2003 songs
2016 singles
2016 songs
A&M Records singles
Anti-war songs
Charity singles
Contemporary R&B ballads
Dutch Top 40 number-one singles
European Hot 100 Singles number-one singles
Interscope Records singles
Irish Singles Chart number-one singles
Justin Timberlake songs
Number-one singles in Australia
Number-one singles in Austria
Number-one singles in Denmark
Number-one singles in Germany
Number-one singles in Norway
Number-one singles in Poland
Number-one singles in Romania
Number-one singles in Scotland
Number-one singles in Sweden
Number-one singles in Switzerland
UK Singles Chart number-one singles
Pop ballads
Protest songs
Song recordings produced by Ron Fair
Song recordings produced by will.i.am
Songs about the media
Songs against racism and xenophobia
Songs of the Iraq War
Songs written by apl.de.ap
Songs written by George Pajon
Songs written by Ron Fair
Songs written by Taboo (rapper)
Songs written by will.i.am
Black Eyed Peas songs
Ultratop 50 Singles (Flanders) number-one singles